Since 2002, the Department of Homeland Security has provided Port Security Grants to ports within the United States, to build fireboats. These vessels are thought to help keep the entire United States safer, because, in addition to fighting local fires, they are all equipped to help counter nuclear fallout, chemical weapons and biological weapons.

The grants are made under the Maritime Transportation Security Act of 2002. The Federal Emergency Management Agency, one of the agencies under DHS, provided $100 million worth of grants in 2015.

References

Grants (money)
Security
United States Department of Homeland Security